The name Gener has been used in the Philippines by PAGASA in the Western Pacific.
 Tropical Storm Chanthu (2004) (T0405, 08W, Gener) – struck the Philippines and China.
 Tropical Depression Gener (2008) – a tropical depression that was only recognized by PAGASA.
 Typhoon Saola (2012) (T1209, 10W, Gener)
 Typhoon Malakas (2016) (T1616, 18W, Gener)
 Tropical Depression 06W (2020) (06W, Gener)

Pacific typhoon set index articles